John Lucas (born 1937) is a poet, critic, biographer, anthologist and literary historian. He runs a poetry publishers called Shoestring Press, and he is the author of 92 Acharnon Street (Eland, 2007), which won the Dolman Best Travel Book Award in 2008.

Biography
Lucas was born in Devon in 1937. He has taught English at universities throughout the world, and is Professor Emeritus at the Universities of Loughborough and Nottingham Trent. He has written and translated over forty books, including critical studies of Dickens, John Clare and Arnold Bennett, books on English poetry, an anthology of the works of Nancy Cunard, as well as a life of his maternal grandfather, which combines biography with social history. In 2010 he published Next Year Will Be Better: A Memoir of England in the 1950s. Since 2011, Lucas has also written several novels, including Waterdrops (2011).

His collections of poetry include Studying Grosz on the Bus, winner of Aldeburgh Festival Poetry Prize, A World Perhaps: New & Selected Poems, Flute Music and Things to Say. He has also edited an anthology, The Isles of Greece, for Eland. For over ten years he was poetry reviewer for the New Statesman. His most recent books include A World Perhaps: New and Selected Poems, The Radical Twenties: Writing, Politics, Culture, and The Good That We Do.

Lucas plays jazz cornet and trumpet with the Nottingham-based Burgundy Street Jazzmen. In 1994 he founded Shoestring Press.

Bibliography

 Tradition and Tolerance in Nineteenth-century Fiction: critical essays on some English and American novels (with David Howard and John Goode) 1966
 A Selection from George Crabbe (as editor) 1967
 The Melancholy Man: a study of Dickens's novels 1970
 About Nottingham: twelve poems 1971 
 Literature and Politics in the Nineteenth Century: essays (as editor) 1971
 A Brief Bestiary: Poems 1972
 Arnold Bennett, a study of his fiction 1974 
 Literature of Change: Studies in the Nineteenth-century provincial novel 1977
 The 1930s: A Challenge to Orthodoxy (as editor) 1978
 Mansfield Park by Jane Austen (editor) 1980
 Poems of G. S. Fraser (edited with Ian Fletcher) 1981
 Romantic to modern literature: essays and ideas of culture, 1750-1900 1982
 The Days of the Week (poems) 1982
 Moderns and Contemporaries: novelists, poets, critics 1985
 The Trent Bridge Battery: the story of the sporting Gunns (with Basil Haynes) 
 Egil's saga (translator, with Christine Fell) 1985
 Modern English Poetry from Hardy to Hughes 1986
 Selected Writings: Oliver Goldsmith (as editor) 1988
 Studying Grosz on the Bus (poems) 1989
 England and Englishness: ideas of nationhood in English poetry, 1688-1900 1990
 D. H. Lawrence: Selected Poetry and Non-Fictional Prose (as editor) 1990
 Charles Dickens: the Major Novels 1992
 Flying to Romania 1992
 New Lines from Leicestershire: a verse anthology (as editor) 1992
 John Clare 1994
 Writing and Radicalism (as editor) 1996
 The Radical Twenties 1997
 One For the Piano: Poems 1998
 For John Clare: An Anthology of Verse 1997
 Robert Bloomfield: Selected Poems (as editor, with John Goodridge) 1998
 William Blake 1998
 Stanley Middleton at Eighty (as editor, with David Belbin) 1998
 On the Track (poems) 2000
 Ivor Gurney 2001
 Starting to Explain: essays on twentieth century British and Irish poetry 2003
 The Long and the Short of it 2004
 A World Perhaps: New and Selected Poems 2004
 Poetry: the Nottingham Collection (as editor) 2005
 Poems of Nancy Cunard: from the Bodleian Library (as editor) 2005
 The Winter's Tale 2005
 Flute Music (poems) 2006
 92 Acharnon Street: A Year in Athens 2007
 Shakespeare's Second Tetralogy: Richard II - Henry V 2007
 I, the poet Egil : versions of the poems of Egil's saga 2008
 Harry Chambers & Peterloo Poets: 37 years of poetry publishing 2009
 Shoestring's Commons (as editor) 2009
 All My Eye & Betty Martin 2010 
 The Isles of Greece: a collection of the poetry of place 2010
 Next Year Will Be Better: A Memoir of England in the 1950s 2010
 Things to Say 2010
 Waterdrops  2011 (novel)
 Second World War Poetry in English 2013
 A Brief History of Whistling (with Allan Chatburn) 2015
 Portable Property 2015 
 The Awkward Squad: rebels in English cricket 2015
 Ten Poems About Nottingham 2015 (as editor)
 The Plotting 2016 (novel)
 Summer Nineteen Forty-Five 2017 (novel)
 Julia 2019 (novel)
 Remembered Acts 2020 (novel)
 The Life in Us 2021 (novel)
 That Little Thread 2023 (novel)

References

1937 births
Living people
British non-fiction writers
British travel writers
British poets
British biographers
21st-century British novelists